This list is of the Places of Scenic Beauty of Japan located within the Prefecture of Shizuoka.

National Places of Scenic Beauty
As of 1 January 2021, eleven Places have been designated at a national level (including one *Special Place of Scenic Beauty); Mount Fuji spans the prefectural borders with Yamanashi.

Prefectural Places of Scenic Beauty
As of 1 May 2020, seven Places have been designated at a prefectural level.

Municipal Places of Scenic Beauty
As of 1 May 2020, sixteen Places have been designated at a municipal level.

Registered Places of Scenic Beauty
As of 1 January 2021, two Monuments have been registered (as opposed to designated) as Places of Scenic Beauty at a national level.

See also
 Cultural Properties of Japan
 List of parks and gardens of Shizuoka Prefecture
 List of Historic Sites of Japan (Shizuoka)

References

External links
  Cultural Properties in Shizuoka Prefecture

Tourist attractions in Shizuoka Prefecture
Places of Scenic Beauty

ja:Category:静岡県にある国指定の名勝